Frederick David Chaplin (9 November 1920 – 19 December 1999) was Dean of Trinidad from 1961 to 1968.

Chaplin was born in on November 9, 1920 and educated at Corpus Christi College, Oxford. He was ordained in 1951 and began his ecclesiastical career with a curacy in Glastonbury. He was Chaplain of Wells Theological College from 1955 to 1957 and its Vice Principal from then until his appointment as Dean. Afterwards he worked firstly for the World Council of Churches and then held he held various administrative posts within the Anglican Communion. 

Chaplin died on December 19, 1999.

References

1920 births
Alumni of Corpus Christi College, Oxford
Deans of Trinidad
1999 deaths